Alfredo Woodward Téllez (1905–1988) was a Mexican businessman, politician and member of the Institutional Revolutionary Party. He was born in Oaxaca City, Oaxaca, on December 9, 1905, and died of old age on April 25, 1988. He was the son of American William John Woodward and Josefina Tellez Gil.

Career
Woodward arrived in Manzanillo, Colima, as manager of the customs agency, Alberto P. Rojas and sons, a powerful business that was based at the corner of Calle Donceles in Mexico City and had branches in Veracruz, Tamaulipas, Chihuahua, Chiapas, Oaxaca, Sinaloa, Sonora and Texas. He held many other types of employment before becoming an entrepreneur, such as police, driver, desk clerk, carrier and film actor.

Woodward came to possess, in addition, a whole fishing fleet. During World War II he was devoted to fishing for shark and hammerhead, exporting large quantities of shark parts to be used for the manufacture of vitamin A. Together with Guillermo Adachi and Luis Garcia Castillo, he was one of the most active promoters of the International Tournament of Sailfishing in Manzanillo, participating in that sport for many years.

Political career
Woodward was local deputy to the Colima Congress for the XXXVII Legislature (1954–1955). He was mayor of the city of Manzanillo in Colima state during the period 1951 to 1954. He was Communicator of the Beacons of the Navy Department in the Mexican Pacific.

Legacy
Woodward 's name is linked to the work and policies of the Manzanillo port, either through the customs business of his son Guillermo Woodward Rojas or through Alfredo Woodward Rojas, former candidate for president and municipal councilor for the Democratic Revolutionary Party.

References

Institutional Revolutionary Party politicians
1905 births
1988 deaths
20th-century Mexican businesspeople
People from Oaxaca City
Mexican people of American descent